Laura Terech is an American politician, teacher, community organizer and a Democratic member of the Arizona House of Representatives elected to represent District 4 in 2022.

Education
Terech graduated from the University of Arizona, and attended grad school in New York. She went on to become a public school teacher.

Elections
2022 Terech was unopposed in the Democratic primary. She went on to defeat former Republican State Representative Maria Syms in the general election, but was elected to serve alongside Republican newcomer Matt Gress in the legislature.

References

External links
 Biography at Ballotpedia

Democratic Party members of the Arizona House of Representatives
Living people
Year of birth missing (living people)
21st-century American politicians
People from Scottsdale, Arizona
21st-century American women politicians
University of Arizona alumni